Cottonwood is a ghost town in Brazos County, in the U.S. state of Texas. It is located within the Bryan-College Station metropolitan area.

History
Cottonwood was first settled when J.W. Bickham settled along Wickson Creek in the late 1850s and operated a store in the area. It was named after a large grove of cottonwood trees. A local Baptist church was built in the area in 1860. From that decade to the 1880s, three cotton gins named Bickham, Gallatin, and Kieffer operated in the community. A cemetery was established in the late 1800s, with the oldest graves dating back to 1887. Another Baptist church was built in 1910. This church and its cemetery remained in the community in the late 20th century. Cottonwood never had a population recorded.

Geography

Education
The Cottonwood Baptist Church that was built in 1910 was used as a school and continued to operate into the 1930s. Today, Cottonwood is located within the Bryan Independent School District.

References

Ghost towns in Texas